Senda Gharbi (born 29 January 1967) is a Tunisian swimmer. She competed in four events at the 1988 Summer Olympics.

References

1967 births
Living people
Tunisian female swimmers
Olympic swimmers of Tunisia
Swimmers at the 1988 Summer Olympics
Swimmers at the 1987 Mediterranean Games
Swimmers at the 1991 Mediterranean Games
Mediterranean Games gold medalists for Tunisia
Mediterranean Games silver medalists for Tunisia
Mediterranean Games bronze medalists for Tunisia
Mediterranean Games medalists in swimming
Place of birth missing (living people)
African Games medalists in swimming
Competitors at the 1987 All-Africa Games
African Games gold medalists for Tunisia
African Games bronze medalists for Tunisia
20th-century Tunisian women